Orana Steiner School, founded in 1981, is an independent, educational Steiner school in Weston, Australian Capital Territory, Australia. It enlists children from pre-school through to year 12.

Curriculum
The teaching curriculum is based on the works of Rudolf Steiner. The school offers a wide range of subjects including mathematics, sciences humanities, languages, arts, design-technology and English. It has an excellent reputation for its academic achievements, with high ATAR scores and a broad education that prepares its students to take their place in a global society. The school aims to inspire creative and flexible thinking, resilience and a will to engage in life. .

See also
 List of schools in the Australian Capital Territory

References

External links
 

Private primary schools in the Australian Capital Territory
Private secondary schools in the Australian Capital Territory
Waldorf schools in Australia
1981 establishments in Australia
Educational institutions established in 1981